Paul Séguier (born 8 September 1997) is a French professional rugby league footballer who plays as a  for the Catalans Dragons in the Super League and France at international level. 

He has spent time on loan at Saint-Esteve in the Elite One Championship, and Toulouse Olympique and the Barrow Raiders in the Betfred Championship.

Background
Seguier was born in Albi, France.

Career
Séguier is a French under 19 international.

International
He made his international debut on 25 Oct 2019 in the 62-4 defeat to the Junior Kangaroos.

References

External links
Catalans Dragons profile
SL profile
Toulouse Olympique profile
France profile
French profile

1997 births
Living people
AS Saint Estève players
Barrow Raiders players
Catalans Dragons players
France national rugby league team players
French rugby league players
Rugby league props
Toulouse Olympique players